Julie Gantzel (born 13 April 1994) is a Danish handballer who plays for Ikast Håndbold.

References

1994 births
Living people
Danish female handball players
People from Ikast-Brande Municipality
Sportspeople from the Central Denmark Region